The lateral collateral ligament of ankle joint (or external lateral ligament of the ankle-joint) are ligaments of the ankle which attach to the fibula.

Structure
Its components are:
 anterior talofibular ligament
The anterior talofibular ligament attaches the anterior margin of the lateral malleolus to the adjacent region of the talus bone. The most common ligament involved in ankle sprain is the anterior talofibular ligament. 
 posterior talofibular ligament
The posterior talofibular ligament runs horizontally between the neck of the talus and the medial side of lateral malleolus
 calcaneofibular ligament
The calcaneofibular ligament is attached on the posteromedial side of lateral malleolus and descends posteroinferiorly below to a lateral side of the calcaneus.

References

See also
 Sprained ankle

Ligaments of the lower limb